HSBC is a British multinational investment bank.

It may also refer to:

Banking
 HSBC Building, the Bund
 HSBC Building (Hong Kong)
 HSBC Tower, London
 HSBC Tower, Shanghai

See also
 HSBC Bank (disambiguation)

Sport
Hampton School Boat Club

Other
Humane Society of Bergen county